The 2019–20 season of the English Men's National Basketball League,  known as the NBL, was the 48th edition of the league. Solent Kestrels were league champions for the second consecutive year.

Following the 2018–19 season, the league structure was reorganised. Division 2 was regionalised into North and South regions, while Divisions 3 and 4 were merged to form 5 regional leagues.

In March 2020, the season was cancelled due to the COVID-19 pandemic. The league season finished immediately and there were no end-of-season playoffs.

National League Division 1

Teams

Team changes
 Barking Abbey Crusaders to Barking Abbey
 Essex Leopards to Essex & Herts Leopards

Promoted from Division 2
 Liverpool
 Westminster Warriors

Relegated to Division 2
 Newcastle University
 Manchester Magic

Regular season

 Following the cancellation of the season on 13 March 2020, it was decided that for games cancelled due to the early end to the season, the number of points on offer would be divided equally between the two teams involved (one point per team). This process applied to fixtures that were scheduled between 13 March (the date on which Basketball England suspended the playing season) and the end of the regular season. Games that were postponed before March 13 and had not been rearranged were voided. (zero points per team).

Player of the Week awards

Statistics
Minimum 10 games

Scoring
As of 16 May 2020 

Rebounding
As of 16 May 2020 

Assists
As of 16 May 2020

National League Division 2

Regular season

National League Division 3

Regular season

National Cup

First round

Second round

Third round

Fourth round

Quarter-finals

Semi-finals
The draw for the semi-finals took place on 18 December 2019.

Final

References

English Basketball League seasons
English
English
Basketball
Basketball
Basketball events curtailed and voided due to the COVID-19 pandemic